Naima El Jeni is a Tunisian actress.

Filmography

Cinema 
 1990 : Halfaouine Child of the Terraces by Férid Boughedir
 1996 : Miel et Cendres by Nadia Fares Anliker : Dalenda
 2002 : Poupées d'argile by Nouri Bouzid
 2004 : Parole d'hommes by Moez Kamoun
 2005 : Khochkhach by Selma Baccar
 2008 : Le Projet (Short films) by Mohamed Ali Nahdi
 2016 : Woh ! by Ismahane Lahmar : Dalenda

Television

Series 
 1992 :
 El Douar by Abdelkader Jerbi : Selma
 Ouled Ennas by Moncef Dhouib : Saoussen
 1993 :
 Warda by Hamadi Arafa
 El Assifa by Abdelkader Jerbi : Radhia
 1995 :
 Edhak Ledonia by Tahar Fazaa : Fatma
 La Chute du sable by Mohamed Ghodbane : Zina
 1996 : Le Drapeau et la pluie by Fawaz Abdelki
 1996 - 1997 : El Khottab Al Bab by Slaheddine Essid : Hadda
 1997 : Bab El Khoukha by Abdeljabbar Lebhouri : Nadhira
 2000 : Mnamet Aroussia by Slaheddine Essid : Sassia
 2000 - 2001 : Idhhak Li Doniya by Abderrazak Hammami : Fatma
 2001 : Dhafayer by Habib Mselmani : Louiza
 2003 : Ikhwa wa Zaman by Hamadi Arafa : Mongia
 2004 : Hissabat w Aqabat by Habib Mselmani : Meriem Bent Saouef
 2005 : Aoudat Al Minyar by Habib Mselmani : Chahla
 2006 : Hayet Wa Amani by Mohamed Ghodhbane : Hayet
 2007 : Kamanjet Sallema by Hamadi Arafa : Neïla
 2007 - 2009 : Choufli Hal (seasons 4–6) by Slaheddine Essid and Abdelkader Jerbi : Kalthoum
 2008 : Sayd Errim by Ali Mansour : Nejma
 2010 :
 Casting by Sami Fehri (guest of honor)
 Garage Lekrik by Ridha Béhi
 2012 : Dar Louzir by Slaheddine Essid : Janet
 2013 : Yawmiyat Imraa by Khalida Chibeni : Habiba
 2013 - 2014 : Caméra Café by Ibrahim Letaïef : Bahija
 2014 : Naouret El Hawa (season 1) by Madih Belaïd : Khadija
 2014 - 2015 : Bent Omha by Youssef Milad and Mokhless Moalla : Douja
 2015 : Le Risque by Nasreddine Shili
 2016 - 2018  : Denya Okhra by Sami Fehri : Mongia
 2016 :
 Sohba ghir darjine by Hamza Messaoudi : Habiba
 Bolice 2.0 by Majdi Smiri (guest of honor)
 2019 :
 Sohba ghir darjine 2.0 by Hamza Messaoudi : Habiba
 El Harba by Kaïs Chkir : the mother of Chakib
 2020 : Denya Okhra by Kaïs Chkir : the mother of Sabri
 2021 :
 Millionnaire by Muhammet Gök
2021 + 2022 : El Foundou de Saoussen Jemni : the mother of Yahia
 2022 : Ken Ya Makenech (season 2) by Abdelhamid Bouchnak

TV movies 
 2007 : Puissant by Habib Mselmani 
 2009 : Choufli Hal by Abdelkader Jerbi : Kalthoum

Emissions 
 2012 : Le Crocodile (episode 9) on Ettounsiya TV
 2014 : L'anglizi (episode 2) on Tunisna TV

Theater 
 2012 : Daddou candidate aux élections présidentielles by Moncef Dhouib
 2016 : Malla Aïla by Sadok Halwes
 Woufa Al Maktoub, text by Tahar Radhouani and director by Sadok Halwes, with Dorsaf Mamlouk: the lawyer
 Aâtini Forssa, director by Sadok Halwes, with Dorsaf Mamlouk
 Ayla (Family), director by Sadok Halwes, with Dorsaf Mamlouk
 Fezzani Mertah, text by Salah Jadiy and Mohamed Ghodbane, with Mongi Ben Hafsia
 Etalibet (The students), text by Azzouz Chennaoui and director by Mongi Ben Hafsia

References

External links

Tunisian film actresses
People from Tunis
Living people
20th-century Tunisian actresses
1958 births